

Sporting venues

The Following is a List of the Venues that will be used during the 2032 Summer Olympics and Paralympics, Which will be held in Brisbane, Queensland, Australia.

Under present IOC policy, venues with corporate naming rights will not be allowed to use their sponsored name during the Olympics.

Venues and infrastructure
Venues will be located in 3 Main Zones, As well as a regional zone. The Main Zones are the Brisbane, Gold Coast and Sunshine Coast Zones. The regional zone will host Football competitions and include Townsville (North Queensland Stadium), Cairns (Barlow Park), Toowoomba (Toowoomba Sports Ground), Sydney (Sydney Football Stadium) and Melbourne (Melbourne Rectangular Stadium).

Brisbane Zone

Gold Coast Zone

Sunshine Coast Zone

Regional Zone

Non-competitive

References

2032
2032
 
Venues
Venues